Empires is the second solo album from American rock singer-songwriter Jimi Jamison, released under the name Jimi Jamison's Survivor on October 17, 1999 for Scotti Brothers, was distributed in Germany by Soulfood Music and produced by Klay Shroedel.

In 2003, after a battle in court over access to the name Survivor, this album would be re-released under his own name for Frontiers Records. The album highlight is the Baywatch hit theme song, as bonus tracks, it appears three live versions from his touring ("Burning Heart", "Rebel Son" and "Too Hot to Sleep") plus the christmas song "Keep it Evergreen" and a cover of the number 2 hit song of the 1976 "Love is Alive" by Gary Wright.

Track listing

Personnel 
 Jimi Jamison - lead vocals
Klay Shroedel - drums, additional keyboards (3, 10)
Chris Adamson - guitar, backing vocals
Hal Butler - keyboards

Additional musicians 
Jorgen Carlsson - bass
Rudy Richardson - piano, keyboards, strings, horns
Peter Roberts - additional acoustic guitar (3, 4), backing vocals
Michael Sembello - additional keyboards (3, 10)
Pete Mendillo - drums (12, 13)
Lisa Frazier - backing vocals, co-lead singer (track 4)
Bobby Kimball - backing vocals

Facts 

Jamison co-wrote and sang "I'm Always Here", the theme of the 1990s hit TV series Baywatch in 1991 for all the seasons and episodes from September 23, 1991 - May 14, 2001 (except for the first season of the TV Series, it replaced "Save Me"). Jamison is credited as the lyricist on this song along with Joe Henry, who co-wrote the Rascal Flatts hit "Skin". The music is credited to Cory Lerios and John D'Andrea.
It took 8 years for the second album released, this was because of Jamison being touring with the band (Jimi Jamison's Survivor) and for working in different projects with other musicians and artists.
Jamison recorded many sessions and demos throughout the 1990s and part of those demos were material that ended up in this album. 
"Empires" was a survivor song from the album Too Hot To Sleep but didn't surface at the moment, this album version shows Lisa Frasier as the co-lead singer.
The songs "Just Beyond The Clouds", "First Day of Love", "Empires", "Cry Tough" and "A Dream Too Far", were originally recorded between 1989-1995.
All the demos and sessions Jimi did can be found as Jamo Sessions, Have Mercy: The Demos and The Mofo Sessions.
The version of "I'm Always Here" is not the original one, this version has been made so it can be suit the album's style and year update.
 It is the last release by Scotti Bros. Records since it got defunct in 1997 and the catalogue was sold to Volcano Entertainment.

References

External links
https://www.loudersound.com/features/buyer-s-guide-survivor

1999 albums
Jimi Jamison albums
Frontiers Records albums
Scotti Brothers Records albums